Bounty Hunters is a 1996 American-Canadian film starring Michael Dudikoff and Lisa Howard. It was directed by George Erschbamer. The film is followed by Bounty Hunters 2: Hardball.

Plot
Jersey Bellini is a bounty hunter who forms an uneasy partnership with a rival to capture a fugitive

Cast
 Michael Dudikoff as Jersey Bellini
 Lisa Howard as B.B.
 Ben Ratner as Deimos
 Erin Fitzgerald as Starr
 Freddy Andreiuci as Izzy
 Ashanti Williams as 'Word'
 Steve Makaj as O'Conner 
 Peter LaCroix as Austraat
 Michael McMillian as Clayton
 Garry Chalk as Wasser
 Mike Mitchell as Ray Colt
 Deryl Hayes as Mr. Hervey
 Angela Moore as Mrs. Hervey
 Claire Riley as Detective Ortega
 Ken Kirzinger as Kesh
 Farhad Dordar as Laredo / Chopper #3
 Lindsay Bourne as Hector 
 Alex Green as Arthur Korn
 Jim Johnston as Sergeant 
 Ron Robinson as Huge Gangsta
 John Prince as A.D.
 Charles Andrew Payne as French
 George Josef as Ernesto Cabal
 Shonna Baxter as Bimbarella
 Anne Openshaw as Diner Waitress
 Tina McKinney as Bikini Babe
 Carla Elder as Babe #1
 Francine Raymor as Babe #2
 Juliet Reagh as Sexy Dancer

Reception
Comeuppance Reviews gave the film three stars and stated: "Bounty Hunters has humor and inoffensive action, which should please viewers who want a break from more serious viewing.".

References

External links
 
 
 Bounty Hunters at Movie Web
 Bounty Hunters at Letterboxd

1996 films
1996 action comedy films
American action comedy films
Canadian action comedy films
English-language Canadian films
1990s English-language films
1990s American films
1990s Canadian films